In mathematics, a profinite integer is an element of the ring (sometimes pronounced as zee-hat or zed-hat)

where

This group is important because of its relation to Galois theory, étale homotopy theory, and the ring of adeles. In addition, it provides a basic tractable example of a profinite group.

Construction 

The profinite integers  can be constructed as the set of sequences  of residues represented as

 

such that .

Pointwise addition and multiplication make it a commutative ring.

The ring of integers embeds into the ring of profinite integers by the canonical injection:
 where 

Using Factorial number system 

Every integer  has a unique representation in the factorial number system as

In the same way, a profinite integer can be uniquely represented in the factorial number system as an infinite string , where each  is an integer satisfying .

The digits  determine the value of the profinite integer mod . More specifically, there is a ring homomorphism  sending

The difference of a profinite integer from an integer is that the "finitely many nonzero digits" condition is dropped, allowing for its factorial number representation to have infinitely many nonzero digits.

Using the Chinese Remainder theorem 

Another way to understand the construction of the profinite integers is by using the Chinese remainder theorem. Recall that for an integer  with prime factorization

of non-repeating primes, there is a ring isomorphism

from the theorem. Moreover, any surjection

will just be a map on the underlying decompositions where there are induced surjections

since we must have . It should be much clearer that under the inverse limit definition of the profinite integers, we have the isomorphism

with the direct product of p-adic integers.

Relations

Topological properties 
The set of profinite integers has an induced topology in which it is a compact Hausdorff space, coming from the fact that it can be seen as a closed subset of the infinite direct productwhich is compact with its product topology by Tychonoff's theorem. Note the topology on each finite group  is given as the discrete topology.

The topology on  can be defined by the metric,

Since addition of profinite integers is continuous,  is a compact Hausdorff abelian group, and thus its Pontryagin dual must be a discrete abelian group. 

Relation with adeles 
The tensor product  is the ring of finite adelesof  where the symbol  means restricted product. That is, an element is a sequence that is integral except at a finite number of places. There is an isomorphism

Applications in Galois theory and Etale homotopy theory 
For the algebraic closure  of a finite field  of order q, the Galois group can be computed explicitly.

Relation with Etale fundamental groups of algebraic tori 
This construction can be re-interpreted in many ways. One of them is from Etale homotopy theory which defines the Etale fundamental group  as the profinite completion of automorphismswhere  is an Etale cover. Then, the profinite integers are isomorphic to the groupfrom the earlier computation of the profinite Galois group. In addition, there is an embedding of the profinite integers inside the Etale fundamental group of the algebraic torussince the covering maps come from the polynomial mapsfrom the map of commutative rings sending since .

Class field theory and the profinite integers 
Class field theory is a branch of algebraic number theory studying the abelian field extensions of a field. Given the global field , the abelianization of its absolute Galois groupis intimately related to the associated ring of adeles  and the group of profinite integers. In particular, there is a map, called the Artin mapwhich is an isomorphism. This quotient can be determined explicitly asgiving the desired relation.

See also 
p-adic number
Ring of adeles
Supernatural number

Notes

References

External links 
http://ncatlab.org/nlab/show/profinite+completion+of+the+integers
https://web.archive.org/web/20150401092904/http://www.noncommutative.org/supernatural-numbers-and-adeles/
https://euro-math-soc.eu/system/files/news/Hendrik%20Lenstra_Profinite%20number%20theory.pdf

Algebraic number theory